The Vorholz is a ridge up to 243 m high in the districts of Hildesheim and Wolfenbüttel in the German state of Lower Saxony.

Geography 
The heavily-wooded Vorholz is located in the north of the Innerste Uplands, part of the Lower Saxon Hills. It lies north of the valley of the River Innerste between the ridges of Lichtenberge (northwestern section of the Salzgitter Hills) to the southeast, the Hainberg to the south-southeast, the Sauberge to the south-southwest and the Hildesheim Forest to the west-southwest. It is also east-southeast of the city of Hildesheim and west of  Salzgitter between Schellerten in the north, Burgdorf in the east-northeast and Holle in the south.

Description 
The Vorholz attains its highest point on the summit of the Knebelberg, 243 m high, and is the source region for several tributaries of the Innerste (which touches it tangentially in the south) and the Fuhse (which is some way to the northeast). It is crossed by numerous walking and forest trails. There is a transmission tower on the Barenberg near Grasdorf and a derelict observation tower on the Ortsberg near Astenbeck.

A section of the A 7 autobahn runs in an east-west direction through the Vorholz, as does part of the  B 6 highway. The  B 444 runs north-south through the ridge.

Elevations 
The elevations of the Vorholz include:

 Knebelberg (243 m above NN) 
 Barenberg (227 m) - with transmission tower
 Heidelbeerenberg (221 m) 
 Langer Berg (216 m) 
 Großer Steinberg (213 m) 
 Wenser Berg (209 m) 
 Spitzhut (207 m) 
 Ilsenberg (201 m) 
 Mieckenberg (200 m) 
 Kleiner Steinberg (175 m) 
 Thieberg (175 m) 
 Galgenberg (172 m) - with observation tower
 Rehberg (165 m) 
 Ortsberg (157 m) - with observation tower

Towns and villages 
The towns and villages in and around the Vorholz are:

 Burgdorf to the northeast
 Hildesheim to the west-northwest
 Holle to the south
 Salzgitter to the east
 Nettlingen to the north

References 

Forests and woodlands of Lower Saxony
Central Uplands
Ridges of Lower Saxony
Natural regions of the Weser-Leine Uplands